Constant de Rebecque is an old noble family which originated in Aire, in the French region of Artois. It takes its name from Rebecques in Artois, which the family received as a barony in 1213. After having converted to Protestantism and sided with Henri IV as high ranking officers during the French Wars of Religion, most of the family fled France for Switzerland.

Family tradition dictated, however, that many members of the house were officers in the French Royal Lifeguard, the Cent Suisses, with the last one to do so being Jean Victor de Constant Rebecque.
The family have, since its move to Switzerland, branched out and naturalised in other European countries, such as Sweden, Norway, the Netherlands and possibly Ireland.

Through its many branches, the house has belonged to the Dutch nobility, as well as the Swedish and the peerage of Ireland. 

The house originates from the region of Artois in France. Members of the house of Constant took part in all the crusades as well as the Huguenot Wars before leaving France.

Members of the family hold the dutch title of baron and the customary styling of French marquis

Members 
 Benjamin Constant
 Jean Victor de Constant Rebecque
 David-Louis Constant de Rebecque
 Jean d'Estournelles de Constant
 Paul-Henri-Benjamin d'Estournelles de Constant

Claimed titles 
 Marquis de Rebecque
 Baron de Constant
 Baron de Clarcque
 Swedish noble
 Lord of Hermenches
 Lord of Villars
 Lord of Flon
 Lord of Mendras

See also 
 Institut Constant de Rebecque
 Adlercrona

References

 
Dutch nobility
French nobility
Swiss nobility
Swedish nobility